

Louis-Marie Autissier ( 1772 –  1830), was a French-born Belgian portrait miniature painter. According to Marjorie E. Wieseman, curator of European painting, at the Cincinnati Art Museum,  "Autissier's success as a miniaturist was in large measure due to his talent as a colourist and his meticulous detailing of costumes and accessory." He is considered the founder of the Belgian school of miniature painting in the nineteenth century. Among his most accomplished pupils and followers were Alexandre Delatour (1780—1858), Louis Henry Fontenay (1800—1852), and Dominique Ducaju (1802—1867). His works are in the collections of the Cincinnati Art Museum, the Nationalmuseum and the Royal Collection.

Biography
Born at Vannes, in Brittany, Autissier studied art under Vautrin at the École nationale supérieure des Beaux-Arts. He joined the French Revolutionary army at Rennes in 1791. Serving as secretary to the local commander, his skill as a draftsman  was quickly recognised. On leaving the army in 1795, Autissier went to Paris and furthered his training by studying paintings at the Louvre. In 1796 he settled in Brussels, there he devoted himself to miniature painting, and became famous for his portraits.

The following years of his life were divided between Belgium, the Netherlands, and France. He exhibited works regularly at Salons in Brussels, Ghent, Antwerp, Amsterdam, and Paris; and was much employed in painting miniature portraits of the sovereigns, nobility, and celebrities of Belgium and the Netherlands. In 1806, after the Revolution, and the forming of the First French Empire he was named court painter to Louis Bonaparte, French King of the Netherlands from 1806 to 1810; and in 1815, court painter to Willem I, king of the Netherlands. At the same time, the artist assumed the first names of his father; from 1801 to 1820 he exhibited under the name Jean François. Returning to Brussels in 1809, Autisier painted a portrait of the duke of Wellington in 1817 and, later in Paris, King Louis XVIII and members of the royal family. Apart from portraits, Autissier occasionally executed historical scenes in miniature - a rare subject matter in this genre.

Autissier exhibited two sorts of miniatures at the annual Salons: portraits of his most prestigious clients and, from 1811, "fancy pictures," or idealized genre subjects, generally made for sale on the open market rather than on commission These attractive studies of young women are described in the Salon catalogues as "portraits idéal," "études de fantaisie," or "figures de fantaisie," and generally priced between 400 and 600 francs, a considerable sum for the period. Many of the models in these miniatures wear the regional costume of Belgium and the Netherlands; others are more exotically clad in Circassian, Portuguese, or English dress. Altogether his paintings include more than 250 miniatures. Autissier died penniless in Brussels on 4 September 1830.

Notes

 Some sources give his name as "Alexandre de la Tour."

References

Bibliography

Attribution:
 

Lucien Lemaire,  Autissier, miniaturiste, 1772-1830 (Lille, 1912) exhibition catalogue  Brussels, Kreditbank.
Autissier et le portraitc miniature romantique en Belgique, exhibition catalogue by Bodo Hofstetter and Philippe Plantade, 1998. Brussels, Kreditbank.

1772 births
1830 deaths
Artists from Vannes
Portrait miniaturists
Court painters
Belgian painters
18th-century French painters
French male painters
19th-century French painters
19th-century French male artists
18th-century French male artists